Charles De Vogelaere (born 16 November 1933) is a Belgian footballer. He played in one match for the Belgium national football team in 1958.

References

External links
 

1933 births
Living people
Belgian footballers
Belgium international footballers
Place of birth missing (living people)
Association football midfielders